Zealandicesa is a genus of flies in the family Empididae.

Species
Z. aequabilis (Plant, 1991)
Z. fascipennis (Sinclair, 1997)
Z. longicauda (Sinclair, 1997)
Z. masneri (Sinclair, 1997)
Z. setosa (Sinclair, 1997)
Z. singularis (Collin, 1928)
Z. tararua (Sinclair, 1997)

References

Empidoidea genera
Empididae